IEEE Internet Computing is a bimonthly peer-reviewed scientific journal published by the IEEE Computer Society. It covers all aspects of emerging and maturing Internet technologies. The editor-in-chief is George Pallis (University of Cyprus). According to the Journal Citation Reports, the journal has a 2017 impact factor of 1.929.

References

External links 
 

Internet Computing
Computer science journals
Publications established in 1997
Bimonthly journals
English-language journals